The 2022–23 season is the 72nd season in the history of F.C. Paços de Ferreira and their fourth consecutive season in the top flight. The club are participating in the Primeira Liga, the Taça de Portugal, and the Taça da Liga.

Squad

Out on loan

Transfers

In

Loans in

Out

Loans out

Pre-season and friendlies

Competitions

Overall record

Primeira Liga

League table

Results summary

Results by round

Matches 
The league fixtures were announced on 5 July 2022.

Taça de Portugal

Taça da Liga

Squad statistics

Appearances and goals

|-
|colspan="14"|Players away on loan:
|-
|colspan="14"|Players who appeared for Paços de Ferreira but left during the season:

|}

Goal scorers

Clean sheets

Disciplinary record

References

F.C. Paços de Ferreira seasons
Paços de Ferreira